Tryphosuchus is an extinct genus of temnospondyl amphibian known from the Isheevo Assemblage Zone and Amanakskaya Formation, European Russia.

References

Stereospondylomorphs
Fossils of Russia
Permian temnospondyls
Fossil taxa described in 1955
Prehistoric amphibian genera